The men's kumite 60 kg competition in karate at the 2001 World Games took place on 18 August 2001 at the Tenno Town Gymnasium in Tenno, Akita, Japan.

Competition format
A total of 7 athletes entered the competition. In preliminary round they fought in two groups. Winners of this groups advanced to gold medal match. Second place athletes advanced to bronze medal match.

Results

Preliminary round

Group A

Group B

Finals

References

External links
 Results on IWGA website

Karate at the 2001 World Games